Yhoshü is an Angami Naga surname. Notable people with the surname include:

 Sesino Yhoshü, Indian filmmaker
 Vikho-o Yhoshü (1952–2019), Indian politician

See also
 Yoshu

Surnames of Naga origin
Naga-language surnames